End mark may refer to 

 Any terminal punctuation at the end of a sentence
 Especially the full stop (period)
 A symbol, such as a bullet, tombstone or miniature logo, used primarily in magazine writing, that indicates the end of an article (especially one that has been interrupted by advertising or by being split up across different sections of the publication for layout purposes).

Punctuation
Typographical symbols